The Iron Sheriff is a 1957 American Western film starring Sterling Hayden.

Plot
A stagecoach is robbed in South Dakota and its driver is killed. A dying man, Gene Walden, tells the sheriff, Sam Galt, that  Sam's son Benjie shot the driver. Benjie is engaged to be married to Walden's daughter.  Benjie is placed under arrest. Newspaper publisher Phil Quincy demands to know what Walden said, but Sam will not say. Quincy and the sheriff are in love with the same woman, Claire, whose father was a lawman killed in the line of duty.

Sam brings in a prominent lawyer, Roger Pollock, to defend his son, and hires a detective, Sutherland, to help find the real culprits. In time, all evidence points to Benjie being the killer; against his lawyer's wishes, Sam testifies to what Walden told him. Benjie is found guilty and sentenced to hang.

Coins from the robbery are found in Kathy's hope chest. Kathy's father, Walden, robbed the stagecoach because his health was failing and he wanted his daughter to have enough money to support herself. Leveret, a telegraph operator who knew the stage's schedule, ambushed it and murdered the driver shortly afterward, not knowing that the money had already been stolen. Walden honestly thought Benjie had committed the murder. Sam manages to bring Leveret to justice in time to save his son.

Cast
 Sterling Hayden as Sam Galt
 Constance Ford as Claire
 John Dehner as Pollock
 Kent Taylor as Quincy
 King Donovan as Leveret
 Kathleen Nolan as Kathy
 Darryl Hickman as Ben Galt
Mort Mills as Sutherland
Walter Sande as Marshal Ellison
Peter Miller as Jackson Gallagher
I. Stanford Jolley as Eugene Walden

Production
The film was originally known as The Trial of Benjie Galt. Filming started 22 October 1956.

See also
 List of American films of 1957

References

External links

1957 films
1957 Western (genre) films
American Western (genre) films
American black-and-white films
1950s English-language films
Films directed by Sidney Salkow
United Artists films
Films produced by Edward Small
Films scored by Emil Newman
1950s American films